Ashok Kumar Dohre is a member of the Indian National Congress and has won the 2014 Indian general elections from the Etawah (Lok Sabha constituency) and former cabinet minister in U.P. Government.

References

Living people
India MPs 2014–2019
Place of birth missing (living people)
People from Etawah district
Lok Sabha members from Uttar Pradesh
Bharatiya Janata Party politicians from Uttar Pradesh
1970 births
People from Auraiya